Duncan is an unincorporated community in Stark County, Illinois, United States, located   north-northwest of Princeville.

History
Duncan was laid out ca. 1870. The community is named for James H. Duncan, a United States Congressman from Massachusetts from 1849 to 1853.

References

Unincorporated communities in Stark County, Illinois
Unincorporated communities in Illinois
Peoria metropolitan area, Illinois